Scopula nemoraria is a moth of the family Geometridae. It is found from central to eastern Europe, east to Russia and China.

Adults are on wing in June.

The larvae feed on Hypericum perforatum  and Lysimachia vulgaris.

References

External links
Lepiforum.de

Moths described in 1799
Moths of Europe
Moths of Asia
nemoraria
Taxa named by Jacob Hübner